The División de Honor 2012–13 is the 50th season of the top flight of the Spanish domestic field hockey competitions since its inception in 1958. It began in autumn 2012. The defending champions are Atlètic Terrassa, while Caldaria-Barrocás and Junior are the teams promoted from División de Honor B.

RC Polo became champions by defeating Club de Campo 2–1 in the final series of championship playoffs.

Competition

Format
The División de Honor season it divides into regular season and championship playoff. The regular season comprises 22 matchdays played from September to April through a round-robin format, a format quite common in other sports as football. When finished the 22 matchdays, the top 4 teams qualified at standings play the championship playoffs, while the bottom two teams are relegated to División de Honor B. Points during regular season are awarded as follows:

2 points for a win
1 point for a draw

During championship playoffs, both the semi finals and the Final are played to best of three matches.

Teams

Number of teams by autonomous community

Regular season standings

Source: Real Federación Española de Hockey

Play-offs

Bracket

Semifinals

1st leg

2nd leg

Club de Campo won series 2–0 and advanced to Final.

R.C. Polo won series 2–0 and advanced to Final.

Final

1st leg

2nd leg

3rd leg

R.C. Polo won the final series 2–1 and became champions.

Top goalscorers
Regular season only.

References

External links
Official site
Competition rules

División de Honor de Hockey Hierba
Spain
field hockey
field hockey